Avascent is a boutique management consulting firm serving the defense, aerospace, homeland security, logistics, transit, and financial industries. It was formed in 2007 after a management-led buyout of DFI Corporate Services from its parent, DFI International (now Detica, since acquired by BAE Systems).

For more than 25 years, Avascent (previously as DFI) has advised the world's largest prime defense contractors and systems integrators. In addition to core markets in defense and aerospace, Avascent's clients also operate in other sectors influenced by government policy, such as energy, transportation and healthcare.

In 2011, the firm was featured in Consulting Magazine's annual Seven Small Jewels feature.

On November 1, 2022, Oliver Wyman acquired the company for an undisclosed amount. Wyman is a management consulting firm owned by the Marsh McLennan group.

Avascent Analytics
In 2009, Avascent launched Avascent Analytics, a subscription-based web-accessible service providing clients comprehensive data covering aerospace, defense, and government driven markets. The database includes a forecast of global defense spending spanning the U.S. and 55 accessible countries, a federal contracts intelligence tool, and forecasting of global space systems.

Recruiting
Avascent typically recruits graduates into one of two tracks.  Analysts are primarily undergraduates recruited from top university campuses. Unlike many consulting firms, Avascent does not have a fixed two-year program for analysts, but instead believes in organically developing future leaders.  Engagement Managers are typically recruited from leading MBA and International Affairs programs, or are mid-career professionals.  Avascent's Engagement Managers lead project teams and develop client relationships on the path to Partner.

Partnerships
Avascent works with non-profit organizations that aim to help people around the world, including:
Build.org - an entrepreneurial experience for underprivileged youth 
Service Never Sleeps - engages young professionals to combat social justice issues through service and civic engagement

Avascent belongs to several government interest business groups, including the Homeland Security Business Council.

In July 2019, Avascent joined the German Aerospace Industries Association (BDLI).

Notable current and former employees
Lori Garver - In 2009, Garver was nominated by Barack Obama as Deputy NASA Administrator. She was confirmed by the United States Senate by unanimous consent on July 15, 2009.
 William Lynn - In 2009, Lynn was nominated by Barack Obama as Deputy Secretary of Defense. His appointment was approved by the U.S. Senate Armed Services Committee on February 5, 2009 by unanimous consent. On February 11, 2009, Lynn was confirmed in the full Senate by a vote of 93–4. He took the oath of office on February 12.

Avascent Global Advisors
In February 2010, Avascent created Avascent International, which became Avascent Global Advisors in 2016, a senior-level advisory arm of Avascent. Working with Avascent, Avascent Global Advisors bring decades of extensive business, diplomatic, governmental, and military experience and expertise. The function of Avascent Global Advisors is to assist clients in identifying strategic opportunities, finding appropriate partners, addressing seen and unseen risk, and offering optimal government relations and market strategies, while navigating the global financial and geostrategic landscapes.

Acquisition by Oliver Wyman 
In October 2022, Oliver Wyman, a global management consulting firm announced its plan to acquire Avascent. The acquisition was completed on November 1, 2022.

References

External links
Avascent
Avascent Global Advisors
Avascent Analytics

Management consulting firms of the United States
Privately held companies based in Washington, D.C.
2022 mergers and acquisitions